Pepo is a 1935 Soviet drama film based on Gabriel Sundukyan's 1876 play of the same name, scripted and directed by Hamo Beknazarian, with music composed by  Aram Khachaturian. Considered the 'most outstanding' film in Soviet cinema before the outbreak of World War II, the film has gained international recognition and has come to represent Armenian culture abroad.

Plot
Set in 19th century Tiflis, the film details the day-to-day life of a poor but honest Armenian fisherman Pepo (Hrachia Nersisyan) who opposes a cunning trader Arutin Kirakozovich Zimzimov (Avet Avetisyan), who has robbed the former by trickery. The story comes to a conclusion of sorts when Pepo falls in love.

Cast

Hrachia Nersisyan – Pepo
Tatyana Makhmuryan – Kekel, his sister
David Malyan – Kakuli, a friend
Avet Avetisyan – Arutin Kirakozovich Zimzimov
Hambartsum Khachanyan – Darcho, merchant
Hasmik – Shushan 
Grigor Avetyan – Giko 
Nina Manucharyan – Natel
Armen Gulakyan – Duduli, a friend
N. Gevorgyan – Efemia
Gurgen Gabrielyan – Kinto
A. Kefchiyan – Pichkhul
H. Vanyan – Margurit
M. Garagash – Gevorg, clerk
Vladimir Barsky – Judge
V. Bagratuni – Samson
M. Beroyan – Darcho's mother
M. Jrpetyan – Gossiper

Images

References

External links

1935 films
1935 drama films
Films directed by Hamo Beknazarian
Soviet black-and-white films
Soviet drama films
Soviet-era Armenian films
Armenfilm films
Films set in Tbilisi
Films scored by Aram Khachaturian
Armenian drama films
Armenian black-and-white films